Charles N. Decas (born October 5, 1937) is an American politician who was Sheriff of Plymouth County, Massachusetts from 2000 to 2001, a member of the Massachusetts House of Representatives from 1977 to 1997, and a member of the Wareham, Massachusetts Board of Selectmen from 1974 to 1977.

References

1937 births
Living people
Politicians from Brookline, Massachusetts
People from Wareham, Massachusetts
Massachusetts sheriffs
Republican Party members of the Massachusetts House of Representatives
Babson College alumni